The RTÉ Studio bombing was a 1969 bomb attack carried out by the Ulster Loyalist paramilitary group the Ulster Volunteer Force (UVF) in Dublin, Ireland. It was the first Loyalist bombing in the Republic of Ireland during The Troubles.

Background
In March and April 1969 the UVF and Ulster Protestant Volunteers (UPV) carried out a number of sabotage bombings in & around Belfast and blamed them on the Irish Republican Army (IRA) in an attempt to get rid of the current Northern Ireland Stormont government who hardline Loyalists felt was too liberal towards Irish nationalism.

Bombing
The attack took place on 5 August 1969 at 1:30am at the RTÉ studios. The blast was heard over a wide area of Dublin city; RTE security officer Vincent Brien suffered some very minor injuries when the explosion knocked him down when he was standing 25 feet away from the blast . The bomb is believed to have been planted at the rear wall of the studio building and not much structural damage was done to the building, except for the shattering of glass panels. Later that morning all Irish daily newspapers had front-page coverage of the blast.

Aftermath
This was the start of a Loyalist campaign of bombings in the Republic of Ireland that would continue until the mid-1970s, with the deadliest being the Dublin and Monaghan bombings which killed 34 civilians in May 1974.

On 19 October 1969, UVF and UPV member Thomas "Tommy" McDowell was electrocuted while planting a bomb at an electricity sub-station in Ballyshannon, County Donegal. He died of his injuries three days later. On 24 October, the UVF claimed responsibility for both the Ballyshannon and the RTÉ bombing. The statement read "the attempted attack was a protest against the Irish Army units still massed on the border in Co Donegal". The statement added: "so long as the threats from Éire continue, so long will the volunteers of Ulster's people's army strike at targets in Southern Ireland". Until then the Irish security forces believed the RTÉ bombing was the work of Irish republicans who had a grudge against RTÉ. The UVF carried out two more bomb attacks in the Republic that year: on the Wolfe Tone memorial in Bodenstown, County Kildare on 31 October, and on 26 December on the Daniel O'Connell monument in Dublin.

Six months after the RTÉ bombing the UVF struck again at RTÉ. On 18 February 1970 it bombed a 240-foot radio mast on Mongary Hill, near Raphoe, County Donegal, putting the transmitter out of action. The mast had allowed RTÉ radio signals to be broadcast into Northern Ireland. The UVF claimed responsibility the next day. UVF sabotage bombings continued sporadically in the Republic throughout 1970 and 1971.

See also
Timeline of Ulster Volunteer Force actions
Belturbet bombing 
1972 and 1973 Dublin bombings
Dublin and Monaghan bombings
Dublin Airport bombing
1975 Dundalk pub bombing 
Castleblayney bombing
1994 Dublin-Belfast train bombing

References

Sources

CAIN Web Service: A Chronology of the Conflict - 1969 CAIN: Chronology of the Conflict 1969 

Jim Cusack & Henry McDonald (writer) - UVF: The Endgame

1969 in the Republic of Ireland
Improvised explosive device bombings in the Republic of Ireland
Explosions in 1969
August 1969 events in Europe
Terrorist incidents in Dublin (city)
Terrorist incidents in Europe in 1969
Terrorist incidents in the Republic of Ireland in the 1960s
Ulster Volunteer Force actions
RTÉ history
Building bombings in Europe
1969 crimes in the Republic of Ireland